Yun Gi-Hae  (born 9 February 1991) is a South Korean footballer who plays as goalkeeper for Gwangju FC in the K-League.

External links 
 

1991 births
Living people
Association football goalkeepers
South Korean footballers
Gwangju FC players
K League 1 players